is a Japanese actress and singer. She started her career as child actress and is represented by Theatre Academy. Besides acting in television dramas and movies, she also acts on stage and is active in voice acting. She has also appeared in several commercials. In 2012, she became one of the Ueno Zoo's Panda Ambassadors and served as a captain.

Filmography

Television dramas 
 Tenchijin (NHK, 2009, eps 29-30), Omatsu (childhood)
 (NHK, 2010, ep 10)
 (NHK, 2011), Anna Uragami
{{Nihongo|Kenji Yoko Asahina 10| 検事・朝日奈耀子 10}} (TV Asahi, 2011)
Don Quixote (NTV, 2011, ep 11), Kaori Murakami
(NHK, 2011), Chiyo
 (TV Asahi, 2012, ep 3)
 (TV Tokyo, 2012, ep 1)
 (TV Asahi, 2012), Ayano Yoshimura (childhood)
Piece – Kanojo no Kioku (NTV, 2012, ep 2), Mizuho Suga (childhood)
 (NHK, 2012), Ayano Kijima (girlhood)
Shotenin Michiru no Minoue Banashi (NHK, 2013, ep 3)
Dinner (Fuji TV, 2013, ep 4), Hazuki (childhood)
GI DREAM (BS Fuji, 2013), Anri Mori (childhood)
 (NHK BS Premium, 2013, ep 1), Soshi (childhood)
 (TV Tokyo, 2013), Ayumi Kobayashi
Hakui no Namida Part 2 Jimei (Fuji TV, 2013), Saya Shiomi
 (Fuji TV, 2013, eps 32-39), Momo Ninomiya
 (TBS, 2013, ep 9), Yui Tanaka
 (NHK BS Premium, 2014), Saya
 (Yomiuri TV, 2014, ep 8), Yuna Sakagami
 (NHK, 2014), Chiyoko (girl)
 (TV Asahi, 2014), Eri Negishi (childhood)
 (Fuji TV, 2014), Grace Miyako Wada (7 years old)
 (Yomiuri TV, 2015, ep 2), Honoka Osawa
 (NHK, 2015, ep 3), Daughter of Kageyama
 (Fuji TV, 2015, ep 1), Rena (childhood) 
 (TBS, 2015, ep 5), Natsuki Kitabayashi
 (TV Tokyo, 2015), Kaori Oikawa
Library Wars: Book Of Memories (TBS, 2015), Marie (girlhood)
 (TBS, 2016), Hitomi (girlhood)

Movies
The Lightning Tree (雷桜, Raiou) (2010), Ritsu
Andalucia: Revenge of the Goddess (2011), Ruka Shindo
Like Father, Like Son (2013)

Stage
Legendary III (2013)
A Wanderer's Notebook (2015)

Anime television
Mushishi Tokubetsu-hen: Hihamukage (2014), Girl
Mushishi Zoku-Shō (2014), Girl (ep 16)
Barakamon (2014), Hina Kubota
Tabi Machi Late Show (2016), Yukari (ep 3)
Kiznaiver (2016), Asuka (ep 10)
Sweetness and Lightning (2016), Tsumugi Inuzuka
Kamiwaza Wanda (2016), Mako
Xuan Yuan Sword Luminary (2018), Long Juan
Re-Main (2021), Asumi Kiyomizu
A Galaxy Next Door (2023), Machi Kuga

Anime films
Dareka no Manazashi (2013), Aya Okamura (Aa-chan) (childhood)
Yu-Gi-Oh!: The Dark Side of Dimensions (2016), Sera (childhood)
Okko's Inn (2018), Miyo Akino
Eureka - Eureka Seven: Hi-Evolution (2021), Iris

Japanese dub
Christopher Robin (Madeline Robin (Bronte Carmichael))
Dolittle (Lady Rose (Carmel Laniado))
Dumbo (Milly Farrier (Nico Parker))
Wednesday (Wednesday Addams (Jenna Ortega))

PV
 Oranje. - "Shiawase." (しあわせ。)  (2012)

Video games 

Granblue Fantasy (2016), Drusilla
God Eater 3 (2018), Phym
Sakura Kakumei ~Hana Saku Otome-tachi~ (2020), Angelica Tamano

References

External links 
 Official agency profile 
 

2005 births
Living people
Japanese child actresses
Japanese voice actresses
Japanese television actresses
Japanese film actresses